Sir Charles Mordaunt, 8th Baronet (5 January 1771 – 30 May 1823) was an English politician. He represented the constituency of Warwickshire in 1804–1820.

He was one of the Mordaunt Baronets, succeeding Sir John Mordaunt, 7th Baronet to the title.

References

1771 births
1823 deaths
Mordaunt baronets
Members of the Parliament of Great Britain for English constituencies
Members of the Parliament of the United Kingdom for English constituencies
UK MPs 1806–1807
UK MPs 1807–1812
UK MPs 1812–1818
UK MPs 1818–1820